Roselle Osk (1884–1954) was an American printmaker known for her drypoints and etchings. Her style was realist and her subjects were figure studies, landscapes, and seascapes. She exhibited frequently during the 1930s and 1940s and was awarded prizes by the  Society of American Etchers, Philadelphia Print Club, and National Association of Women Artists. Her work was often selected for "Best Prints of the Year" shows held by the etchers group.

Early life and education

Osk was born and raised in Manhattan. After graduating from Hunter College in 1903 she studied at the Art Students League until 1906 and at the National Academy of Design from 1912 to 1915. At the Art Students League her teachers were Frank DuMond Henry Reuterdahl Bryson Burroughs and Kenyon Cox. Some years later she also studied at the Grand Central School of Art.

Artistic career

Osk began her career in 1920 as a painter. In 1917 she had begun spending the summer months in Bayport, New York on the south shore of Long Island, and in 1927 she showed paintings for the first of many occasions in a group show held by the Associated Artists of Long Island in Patchogue. In this and other exhibitions of the late 1920s and early 1930s Osk showed portraits in oil, pastel, and crayon, as well as landscapes and a still life in oil. She began her career as a printmaker in 1932 and, while she continued to show oils from time to time, from the middle 1930s onward she mainly showed drypoints and etchings.
 
Osk's work often appeared in exhibitions of organizations of which she was a member. In addition to the Associated Artists of Long Island, these included the Associated American Artists, Art Students League, National Association of Women Artists, Grand Central Art Galleries, and Artists Equity. She also showed with self-organized groups, most prominently ones associated with New York's Municipal Art Committee. In 1936 Osk joined with Will Barnet, Kathrin Cawein, and Betty Waldo Parish to show prints in one such exhibition. In 1939 she joined with six artists to show paintings in another of them.

Throughout her career she made portraits, landscapes and seascapes, figure studies, genre paintings, and still lifes. In 1941 a critic said it was the portraits that had made her famous. In 1938 the New York Times critic, Howard Devree, said that Osk's prints were outstanding. A series of four etchings called, "Hands," was widely admired. When shown in 1937 Devree called them "arresting." When shown again in 1941, the Times critic, Ada Rainy, said they were effective in their characterization, and one of them ("The Sailor," shown at left) was included in the book, American Prize Prints of the Twentieth Century. In her 1941 article on Osk's etchings, Ada Rainey, called "Little Old Lady" (shown at right) "a fine characterization." In 1942 Rainey described a drypoint, "The Sisters" (shown at left), as "done with understanding of the value of strength of line and the structure of the figures." In 1953 the Times critic, Leslie Judd Portner, wrote that Osk's drypoint, "Six O'Clock" (shown at right) was "completely realistic." As well as paintings, etchings, and drypoints, Osk made aquatints and etched relief prints in the late 1940s.

During the 1940s and 1950s Osk held frequent solo exhibitions in Sayville, Long Island and on three occasions held them in Manhattan (1931, 1938, and 1941). During the late 1930s and early 1940s juries often selected her prints for inclusion in "best prints" exhibitions held by the Society of American Etchers. She was awarded prizes in 1938, 1940, 1941, 1945, and 1946.

Artistic practice

Osk usually produced her drypoints and etchings on presses she kept in New York and at a summer home on Long Island. She usually used a cream-colored Japanese paper and made no more than one hundred of each.

Personal life

Osk was the daughter of Herman and Cornelia Thalmessinger Hellenberg. Cornelia Hellenberg, who died in 1915, was a director of the Temple Shaaray Tefila in Manhattan. Herman Hellenberg was a partner in Hellenberg & Lowenstein, manufacturers of men's neck wear. The couple had a second child, a son named Lawrence. In 1906 Osk married Marcus L. Osk, owner of a prosperous Manhattan real estate business named Merit Realty Corp. They had two sons, Richard and George, and a daughter, Virginia (Mrs. Kenneth Poli). Osk died on May 6, 1954, in her home on West 87th Street in Manhattan and was buried in Riverside Cemetery (Saddle Brook, New Jersey).

Notes

References

American etchers
20th-century American women artists
1884 births
1954 deaths
Jewish American artists
Artists from New York City
20th-century painters
Women etchers
American women printmakers